Holmivskyi is an urban-type settlement in eastern Ukraine, located in Horlivka municipality of Horlivka Raion in Donetsk Oblast, at  NNE from the centre of Donetsk. Population has been estimated as

Demographics
In 2001 the settlement had 7737 inhabitants. Native language as of the Ukrainian Census of 2001:
Ukrainian — 51.79%
Russian — 47.86%
Belorussian — 0.09%
Armenian — 0.05%
Moldavian — 0.03%
Rumanian and Slovak — 0.01%

Notable people 

 Kirill Stremousov (1976–2022), Ukrainian separatist politician

References

Urban-type settlements in Horlivka Raion